Thomas S. Hixson is currently a U.S. Magistrate Judge of the United States District Court for the Northern District of California.

Education
Judge Hixson earned his undergraduate and law degrees, both magna cum laude from Harvard University and Harvard Law School, respectively.

Career
Upon graduating law school, Judge Hixson served as a judicial law clerk for the Honorable A. Wallace Tashima, U.S. circuit judge of the U.S. Court of Appeals for the Ninth Circuit.

From 1998-2002, Judge Hixson was an Associate with the law firm of McCutchen, Doyle, Brown & Enersen LLP. From 2002-2014, he worked with the firm of Bingham McCutchen LLP (which McCutchen, Doyle, Brown & Enersen, LLP eventually became) as an Associate and then Partner. From 2014-2018, he was a Partner at Morgan, Lewis & Bockius LLP. At those law firms, Judge Hixson's practice encompassed complex litigation in federal and state courts in fields that included intellectual property, antitrust and unfair competition, water management, energy regulation and telecommunications. Specifically, at Morgan, Lewis & Bockius, Judge Hixson was a Partner in the Intellectual Property — Disputes practice that focused on federal computer software-related IP cases, while his practice continued to include general complex litigation matters, including state and federal antitrust and unfair competition cases.

Judge Hixson also served as a past chair of the California State Bar Antitrust and Unfair Competition Law Section (now the Antitrust, UCL and Privacy Section of the California Lawyers Association) from 2009-2010, having positions of leadership within the Section since 2005. He has also contributed to the Section's treatise, California State Antitrust & Unfair Competition Law, published by Matthew Bender  by writing, since 2012, the annual update to the treatise's chapter on the Consumers Legal Remedies Act. His pro bono work while in private practice included serving as counsel in a complex challenge to telecommunications marketing practices before the California Public Utilities Commission and assisting tenants facing eviction via the San Francisco Superior Court's Housing Negotiation Project. He also served on the board of directors of the AIDS Legal Referral Panel.

Judicial service
On September 4, 2018, Judge Hixson was appointed as a U.S. Magistrate Judge for the Northern District of California. He filled the magistrate judgeship left open by retiring U.S. Magistrate Judge Maria-Elena James.

He is in charge of the Judgement of Extradition of the expresident of Peru, Alejandro Toledo

See also
United States District Court for the Northern District of California
United States Court of Appeals for the Ninth Circuit

External links
The Honorable Thomas S. Hixson, U.S. Magistrate Judge, United States District Court for the Northern District of California
Court Selects Civil Litigator Thomas S. Hixson for San Francisco Magistrate Judgeship

References

Living people
American lawyers
United States magistrate judges
People from San Francisco
21st-century American judges
Harvard Law School alumni
Year of birth missing (living people)